Park Kwang-hyun (born August 21, 1969) is a South Korean commercial and film director. He is best known for co-writing and directing the 2005 critical and commercial hit Welcome to Dongmakgol.

Early life
Park Kwang-hyun grew up in the countryside with his grandmother. When he was in primary school, he began watching his first films, like Superman and Robot Taekwon V, and fell in love with the art of cinema. He would talk about films with his friends all day, and go to the movie theater any chance he got.

Career
For his college degree, Park studied Visual Design at Hongik University. The Hongdae area is known as one of the most diverse and important spots in Korea when it comes to music and arts, many indie bands go through Hongdae clubs before becoming famous, and many artists, designers and writers emerged from this environment.

After graduation, Park started his own company with a few friends, and went on to become one of the most acclaimed figures in the CF (Commercial Film) field. He shot several famous commercials with top stars, from Kyobo Life with Choi Min-sik, to the McDonald's "Don't bet your life" series with Shin Ha-kyun and Im Won-hee.

While going to work, he kept writing his own script, in the hope that one day it would turn into his first feature. Then, all of a sudden, he approached playwright/filmmaker Jang Jin in 2001, saying he was a fan and wanted him to read his script. Jang welcomed young Park into his production company Film It Suda, which featured mostly theater-trained actors and directors. He was the oddity in Jang's group, the sole "style man" out of all those people mostly concerned with dialogue and situation-based drama or comedy.

In 2002 Park directed My Nike (내 나이키), considered the best short film in the Film It Suda omnibus No Comment (묻지마 패밀리). Told from the POV of a young junior high school student (Ryu Deok-hwan) from an urban lower-middle-class family whose greatest desire in the world is to own a pair of Nike sneakers, its authentic but droll character observations remain surprisingly warm and touching. Underlying them is a sense of pathos about class differences based on consumption patterns of the '80s, when Korea was first becoming an out-and-out consumer society and its people were beginning to be defined by what they buy and own. My Nike had a wonderful sense of nostalgia, based on Park's own childhood memories as a teenager growing up in 1980s Korea and tinted with fantasy (with an homage to E.T.).

Jang Jin was so impressed with Park's cinematic humanism he gave him a script for a new project, an adaptation of one of his stage plays, Welcome to Dongmakgol. Set during the Korean War in 1950, soldiers from both the North and South, as well as an American pilot, find themselves in a secluded village, its residents largely unaware of the outside world. Park's first feature film Welcome to Dongmakgol attracted more than 8 million viewers in 2005, making it the second highest-grossing movie that year and among Korean box office's highest of all time.

Park's long-gestating second feature was originally titled Kwon Bob (권법), with Jo In-sung cast as a high school student with superhuman strength who battles injustice in a small town, but it was delayed when investor CJ Entertainment pulled out after the box office failure of Sector 7 in 2011. The project was revived in 2013, and the sci-fi fantasy blockbuster, retitled The Fist, is the largest Korea-China co-production yet with 30% of the  budget coming from the China Film Group and Pegasus & Taihe Entertainment.

Filmography
My Dream Class (short film, 2018)
Fabricated City (2017)
The Fist (2016)
Welcome to Dongmakgol (2005)
My Nike (short film from No Comment, 2002)

Awards
2006 29th Golden Cinematography Awards: Best New Director (Welcome to Dongmakgol)
2005 4th Korean Film Awards: Best Director (Welcome to Dongmakgol)
2005 4th Korean Film Awards: Best Screenplay (Welcome to Dongmakgol)
2005 4th Korean Film Awards: Best New Director (Welcome to Dongmakgol)
2002 New York Festival International Advertising Awards: Gold Medal
2002 Cannes Lions International Advertising Festival: Silver Lion, Fast Food category

References

External links

1969 births
Living people
South Korean film directors
South Korean screenwriters